CNO Financial Group, Inc.  (formerly Conseco, Inc. (from Consolidated National Security Corporation)) is a financial services holding company based in Carmel, Indiana. Its insurance subsidiaries provide life insurance, annuity and supplemental health insurance products to more than four million customers in the United States.  These products are distributed through independent agents, career agents and direct to customers through television advertising and direct mail.

CNO Financial ranked 608 on the Fortune 1000 with 2014 revenues of $4.1 billion. In April 2014, it was ranked among the 50 most-trusted financial institutions in America by Forbes.

History
CNO Financial was incorporated in 1979 as Security National of Indiana Corp. by Stephen Hilbert. SNI bought Consolidated National Life Insurance Co. in 1983. It began insurance operations in 1982 and became a public company in 1985.

In 1986 Conseco acquired Lincoln Income Life Insurance Company for $29 per share or $32.3 mil. Shearson Lehman Brothers advised Lincoln Income Life Insurance. Earlier, in mid-1985, Lincoln had agreed to be acquired by I.C.H. for $31 per share in cash but the merger could not be consummated as the Kentucky Department of Insurance raised objections to certain expenses which Lincoln would have incurred in the merger. Lincoln also received a merger proposal from Redgate in 1985. Satisfied with its recipe for acquiring and improving insurance companies, Conseco stepped up its acquisition efforts in 1986. It purchased Bankers National Life Insurance Company for $118 million, respectively.

In 1998, Conseco purchased the former Greentree Financial, one of the largest financiers of mobile homes, in an attempt to diversify into consumer financial services. They also bought life insurance company Colonial Penn later that year, changing their name to Conseco Direct Life, though changing the name back to Colonial Penn in 2001 (known as Bankers Conseco Life Insurance Company in New York state). Conseco (though not its subsidiary insurance companies) entered Chapter 11 reorganization in 2002 and emerged nine months later in 2003. Conseco's bankruptcy was the third-largest U.S. Chapter 11 filing at the time, after the bankruptcies of WorldCom Inc. and Enron. In the process of reorganization, GreenTree was divested and thereafter Conseco solely focused on the insurance industry.

From its opening in 1999 until 2011, the company (when it was known as Conseco) held the naming rights to the home arena of the NBA's Indiana Pacers; the naming rights were transferred to Bankers Life in 2011.

CNO Financial's CEO, Gary C. Bhojwani, joined the company in April 2016 as president and became CEO in January 2018. Bhojwani is also a member of CNO's Board of Directors.

CNO Financial Group is the parent company of seven insurance companies, including Bankers Life and Casualty Company and Colonial Penn Life Insurance Company. They also owns 40/86 Advisors, an investment management company and Washington National Insurance Company.

On May 11, 2010, the board of directors officially approved changing the holding company's name to CNO Financial Group.

In 2015 February, CNO Financial sold its Hyderabad-based India operations to Cognizant.

References

External links
CNO's homepage
CNO Financial SEC Filings
CNO's Ownership of Washington National Insurance Company

Companies listed on the New York Stock Exchange
Companies based in Indianapolis
Companies that filed for Chapter 11 bankruptcy in 2002
Carmel, Indiana
Financial services companies established in 1979
Insurance companies of the United States
1979 establishments in Indiana